Wolseong-dong is an administrative dong or a neighbourhood in the administrative subdivisions of the Gyeongju City, North Gyeongsang province, South Korea. It consists of nine legal dong including Inwang-dong, Gyo-dong, Dongbang-dong, Doji-dong, Namsan-dong, Pyeong-dong, Guhwang-dong, Bomun-dong and Baeban-dong

It is bordered by Jeongnae-dong and Bodeok-dong on the east, Hwango-dong and Hwangnam-eup on the west, Naenam-myeon on the south and Dongcheon-dong on the north. Its 31.43 square kilometers are home to about  6,269 people. The Gyeongju National Museum, Cheomseongdae, Hwangnyongsa temple site, Gyerim forest, Banwolseong and many cultural and historical sites are situated in the district. 

The population is served by two elementary schools and a joint middle-high school.

See also
Subdivisions of Gyeongju
Administrative divisions of South Korea

References

External links
 The official site of the Wolseong-dong office

Subdivisions of Gyeongju
Neighbourhoods in South Korea